Fráňa Šrámek (January 19, 1877, Sobotka – July 1, 1952, Prague) was a Czech impressionist and vitalist poet, novelist, playwright and anarchist.

In 1885 his family relocated to Písek, where he lived for a long time and much of his work was created in and about this town. After study he joined the military for a period of about a year, but was forced to continue service for another due to bad behavior. In 1914 he fell seriously ill.

Novels 
 Stříbrný vítr
 Tělo
 Past
 Křižovatky

Poems collections 
 Modrý a rudý (1906)
 Splav
 Ještě zní
 Života bído, přec tě mám rád (1905)
 Nové básně
 Rány, růže

See also

 List of Czech writers

External links

  Biography and bibliography
  Short biography and list of works 

1877 births
1952 deaths
Czech male poets
Czech male novelists
20th-century Czech dramatists and playwrights
20th-century Czech novelists
20th-century Czech poets
Czech male dramatists and playwrights
Czech anarchists
People from Jičín District
Austro-Hungarian poets